Janne Reidar Stefansson (born 19 March 1935) is a retired Swedish cross-country skier. He competed at the 1960 and 1964 Olympics in the 15 km and 4 × 10 km events and won a gold medal in the relay in 1964, finishing fourth in 1960. He also finished fourth-fifth in the 15, 30 and 50 km events in 1964.

Stefansson won a silver over 30 km at the 1962 FIS Nordic World Ski Championships in Zakopane. He also won the long distance cross-country ski race Vasaloppet on seven occasions between 1962 and 1969, only missing victory in 1967, when he finished second behind Assar Rönnlund. He was a forester by profession.

Cross-country skiing results
All results are sourced from the International Ski Federation (FIS).

Olympic Games
 1 medal – (1 gold)

World Championships
 1 medal – (1 silver)

References

External links
 
 Sports Illustrated profile

1935 births
Living people
Cross-country skiers at the 1960 Winter Olympics
Cross-country skiers at the 1964 Winter Olympics
Swedish male cross-country skiers
Vasaloppet winners
Olympic medalists in cross-country skiing
FIS Nordic World Ski Championships medalists in cross-country skiing
Medalists at the 1964 Winter Olympics
Olympic gold medalists for Sweden